Erin Lynn Cummings is an American actress and online film pundit. She has appeared in the television series, Charmed, Dante's Cove, The Bold and the Beautiful, Cold Case, Dollhouse, Spartacus: Blood and Sand, and Detroit 1-8-7.

Early life
Cummings was born in Texas. Her father was in the military, and Erin lived in South Korea, Nebraska, and various areas of Louisiana, later growing up in Huntsville, Texas. She graduated from Huntsville High School, and attended Kilgore College in Kilgore, Texas, from 1995 to 1997 after auditioning and being selected for the Kilgore College Rangerettes dance team. After Kilgore, Cummings attended the University of North Texas, graduating with a degree in journalism. She also studied Shakespeare at the London Academy of Music and Dramatic Art.

Career 
Cummings portrayed Erin Ward in Detroit 1-8-7, Michelle in the television drama Dante's Cove. She has had minor roles in TV shows such as Charmed, Passions and Star Trek: Enterprise.

Cummings starred as Sura, the wife of Spartacus, in the Starz series Spartacus: Blood and Sand. Muscle & Fitness magazine featured Cummings in an article and pictorial for their February 2010 issue. In 2013 Erin portrayed Donna Adams in the Primary Stages production of Harbor.

Outside of acting, she regularly guests on The John Campea Show as a pundit bringing her industry knowledge and experience to the show. Cummings also produces her own podcast Kappa Kappa Cancer: Your Guide to the Sorority You Never Wanted to Join focused on her journey as a cancer survivor.

Personal life
In November 2010, Cummings founded Mittens for Detroit, a community initiative that collects and distributes new gloves and mittens to children and adults in that city.

On September 9, 2016, shortly after marrying actor Tom Degnan, Cummings announced that she had been diagnosed with invasive ductal carcinoma—an aggressive form of breast cancer—and had begun treatment at UCLA. Cummings went through chemotherapy, a double mastectomy, and was cancer-free as of 2019.

Filmography

References

External links

 

Actresses from Louisiana
American film actresses
American television actresses
Living people
People from Lafayette, Louisiana
University of North Texas alumni
American expatriates in South Korea
Year of birth missing (living people)
21st-century American actresses